My All American is a 2015 American biographical drama sport film based on the life of college football player Freddie Steinmark. The film was written and directed by Angelo Pizzo. It is based on the book Courage Beyond the Game: The Freddie Steinmark Story by Jim Dent. The film stars Finn Wittrock, Sarah Bolger, Robin Tunney and Aaron Eckhart. The film was released on November 13, 2015, by Clarius Entertainment. The film coincides with the 2015 biography Freddie Steinmark: Faith, Family, Football., It received negative reviews and grossed $2.2 million on a $20 million budget.

Plot
Freddie Steinmark just wants to play football. After constantly being let down by big colleges he finally catches the eye of one coach. Steinmark heads to Austin where he gives his everything for the game he loves.

Taking place in the 1960s, the plot of My All American evolves around a young Freddie Steinmark and his lifelong dream of playing football in college. The audience is first introduced to Freddie as a strong-willed athlete with a big heart. Throughout his time on the high school football team, he meets Bobby, his best friend and teammate, and his longtime girlfriend Linda.

Despite Freddie’s sheer athletic abilities, he finds it increasingly difficult to make his dreams into a reality due to his small size. Just when his family is ready to give up, his high school football coach tells Freddie the University of Texas at Austin is interested. The Longhorn’s head coach, Darrell Royal, allows Freddie and his best friend Bobby to play collegiate football, and fortunately enough Linda enrolls as well.

At the University, Freddie and his peers face a variety of obstacles on and off the field. James’s older brother dies fighting in the Vietnam War overseas, and Freddie begins to feel pain in his knee. Despite these challenges Freddie and the Texas football team persevered, transforming the teams losing streak into an appearance in the 1969 Cotton Bowl Classic. Unfortunately, Freddie’s injury gets the best of him, and he is diagnosed with cancer. The film encapsulates the inspiring true story of Freddie Steinmark, his will to play and his heart of gold.

Cast
 Finn Wittrock as Freddie Steinmark
 Sarah Bolger as Linda Wheeler
 Aaron Eckhart as Darrell Royal
 Robin Tunney as Gloria Steinmark
 Michael Reilly Burke as Fred Steinmark
 Rett Terrell as Bobby Mitchell
 Juston Street as James Street
 Mackenzie Meehan as Nurse Fuller
 Kaci Beeler as Casey Addison, The Reporter

Production
On May 7, 2014, it was announced that Wittrock had been cast in the role of Freddie Steinmark, and Aaron Eckhart had been cast in the role of Darrell Royal. It was also announced that Angelo Pizzo had written the script and was directing the film. On May 16, 2014, it was announced that Sarah Bolger and Robin Tunney had been cast in the roles of Linda Wheeler and Gloria Steinmark respectively.

Filming
Production of the film began on June 24, 2014, and ended on July 16, 2014. The filming was based in Texas. Scenes were shot in 7 different cities ranging from San Antonio to Austin.

Release
The film was originally scheduled to be released on October 9, 2015, in the United States by Clarius Entertainment  However, it was pushed back to November 13, 2015.

Home media
'My All American was released on DVD and Blu-ray in the United States on February 23, 2016 by Universal Pictures Home Entertainment. The film made $2,962,371 in home media sales.

Reception
Box office
The film opened alongside Love the Coopers and The 33. In its opening weekend, it was projected to gross $2–4 million from 1,565 theaters. The film grossed $520,000 on its opening day and $1.4 million in its opening weekend, finishing 11th at the box office.

Critical responseMy All American has received mixed reviews from critics. On Rotten Tomatoes, the film has a score of 33%, based on 43 reviews, with an average rating of 4.8/10. The site's consensus reads, "My All American has a genuinely moving real-life story to tell, but writer-director Angelo Pizzo fumbles it into manipulative, melodramatic tearjerker territory." On Metacritic, the film has a score of 34 out of 100, based on 16 critics, indicating "generally unfavorable reviews". On CinemaScore, audiences gave the film an average grade of "A" on an A+ to F scale.

Dan Callahan gave the film a negative review saying "Even for those who love inspirational sports films might have to flinch from 'My All American' is a movie so square, conservative and humorless that it winds up playing like a brutally straight-faced South Park'' parody of gridiron schmaltz".

References

External links
 
 
 

2015 films
2015 biographical drama films
2010s high school films
2010s sports films
American biographical drama films
American independent films
Films based on biographies
2015 drama films
2015 independent films
Films scored by John Paesano
Films set in 1969
Films set in Austin, Texas
Films set in universities and colleges
Films shot in Texas
Films shot in Dallas
Films shot in San Antonio
High school football films
Texas Longhorns football
2010s English-language films
2010s American films